Richard Hof(f)man(n) may refer to:

 Richard Hoffman (composer) (1831–1909), English-born American pianist and composer
 Richard Hofmann (composer) (1844–1918), German composer and pedagogue who worked in Leipzig
 Richard H. Hoffmann (1887–1967), American psychiatrist
 Richard W. Hoffman (1893–1975), U.S. Representative from Illinois
 Richard Hofmann (1906–1983), German footballer
 Richard Hoffmann (composer) (1925–2021), Austrian-born American composer
 Richard L. Hoffman (1927–2012), American zoologist, specializing in millipedes
 Rick Hoffman (born 1970), American actor
 Richárd Hoffmann (born 1978), Hungarian footballer